Snap It Up! Monster Hits 2 (also known as Hits 12), is a compilation album forming part of the Hits  compilation series. It is the 12th volume in the long-running series. The double album was released in August 1990 and was the follow-up to Monster Hits, released the previous year.

The album reached #2 in the UK Top 20 Compilations Chart and was the second Hits album not to achieve a BPI Platinum award, after 1988's Hits Album. Furthermore, after two volumes, the Monster Hits title was dropped, and the next Hits compilation contained a new title and format.

Snap It Up! features one song which reached number one on the UK Singles Chart: "World in Motion".

Track listing 

Catalogue Number: CDHITS12

CD/Record/Tape 1

Yazz - "Treat Me Good"
Lisa Stansfield - "What Did I Do to You?"
The Chimes - "I Still Haven't Found What I'm Looking For"
Diana Ross - "I'm Still Waiting (Phil Chill 1990 Remix)"
En Vogue - "Hold On"
Bobby Brown - "The Freestyle Mega-Mix" (including "On Our Own", "Don't Be Cruel, "Every Little Step", "My Prerogative")
The Beloved - "Hello"
The Family Stand - "Ghetto Heaven (Remix)"
Alannah Myles - "Black Velvet"
The B-52's - "Love Shack"
Craig McLachlan and Check 1-2 - "Mona (I Need You Baby)"
They Might Be Giants - "Birdhouse in Your Soul"
Aztec Camera - "The Crying Scene"
An Emotional Fish - "Celebrate"
Rod Stewart - "Downtown Train"
Eurythmics - "Angel"
 
CD/Record/Tape 2
David A. Stewart and Candy Dulfer - "Lily Was Here"
Gloria Estefan - "Here We Are"
Paul Young - "Softly Whispering I Love You"
Halo James - "Could Have Told You So"
The Pasadenas - "Love Thing"
Sonia and Big Fun - "You've Got a Friend"
Erasure - "Star"
Pop Will Eat Itself - "Touched by the Hand of Cicciolina"
Black Box - "Everybody Everybody"
England/New Order - "World in Motion"
Guru Josh - "Infinity"
Betty Boo - "Doin' the Do"
Don Pablo's Animals - "Venus (The Piano Mix)"
Snap! - "Ooops Up"
Chad Jackson - "Hear the Drummer (Get Wicked)"
MC Tunes vs. 808 State - "The Only Rhyme That Bites"

References 
Collins Complete UK Hits Albums. Graham Betts. 2005. 

1990 compilation albums
CBS Records compilation albums
Warner Music Group compilation albums
Hits (compilation series) albums